Vol. 2... Hard Knock Life is the third studio album by American rapper Jay-Z. It was released on September 29, 1998, by Roc-A-Fella Records and Def Jam Recordings. It went on to become his most commercially successful album, selling over 5 million copies in the United States. In the liner notes of the album, Jay-Z gives his thoughts on various tracks. The lyrics to the fast-paced "Nigga What, Nigga Who (Originator 99)" are also included.

Background 
Speaking in December 1998 to noted UK urban writer Pete Lewis of the award-winning Blues & Soul, Jay described the background to the album's lyrical themes: "Primarily I see myself as so much more than a rapper. I really believe I'm the voice for a lot of people who don't have that microphone or who can't rap. So I wanted to represent and tell the story of everybody who's been through what I've been through, or knows somebody that has. I also wanted to speak about our lifestyle to people who – though they may live, say, in the suburbs and not be part of that world – still want to know about it and understand it." Jay told MTV News that Vol. 2 was going to be his final album, but he later walked that statement back.

Production 
Several tracks in this feature a rougher sound than the glossier Bad Boy production on In My Lifetime, Vol. 1, most notably the three tracks produced by Ruff Ryders beatmaker Swizz Beatz. With the exception of Stevie J on "Ride or Die," Bad Boy producers play no role in Vol. 2, though Jay-Z enlisted Timbaland, Jermaine Dupri,  and Irv Gotti for a more pop-oriented sound on three of the album's singles. This would also be Jay-Z's last album to feature his mentor Big Jaz.

Critical reception 

In a contemporary review for Playboy, Robert Christgau deemed Vol. 2... Hard Knock Life a progression from its predecessor, featuring more noticeable beats that would appeal to listeners other than just hip hop aesthetes. He highlighted the title track's "audacious Annie sample" and the production of Swizz Beatz, who he believed took influence from postminimalist composers such Steve Reich and Philip Glass. "And whatever Jay-Z's moral values", Christgau wrote, "the man knows how to put words together and say them real fast." He later gave it a three-star honorable mention in his Consumer Guide book, indicating "an enjoyable effort that consumers attuned to its overriding aesthetic or individual vision may well treasure". In The A.V. Club, Nathan Rabin said the record was "an uneven if worthwhile" album whose best songs "strip gangsta rap of its superthug bravado and replace it with a more nuanced understanding of the human emotions behind the gangsta facade". Q called it "the epitome of mainstream hip hop" at the time.

Vol. 2... Hard Knock Life was later ranked number 46 on Rolling Stone magazine's list of the 100 greatest albums from the 1990s.

Commercial performance
Vol. 2... became Jay-Z's first album to debut at #1 on the Billboard 200, selling over 350,000 copies in its first week, and spent a total of 5 consecutive weeks at the top spot. Vol. 2... charted at number one in its second week earning 208,000 copies  and stayed at the top for a third consecutive week selling 186,000 copies. In its fifth week, the album sold just under 174,000 copies and once again stayed at number one. It is Jay-Z's best selling album  and was certified 5× Platinum by the RIAA in 2000. By 2013, the album had sold 5,400,000 copies in the United States. The album won Grammy Award for Best Rap Album at the 41st Annual Grammy Awards. Though he won the nomination he boycotted the ceremony, citing what he sees as the Grammys' continuing disrespect of hip hop because they were not going to broadcast the rap nominations. He told MTV, "I am boycotting the Grammys because too many major rap artists continue to be overlooked. Rappers deserve more attention from the Grammy committee and from the whole world. If it's got a gun everybody knows about it; but if we go on a world tour, no one knows."

Track listing 

Notes
 – co-producer
 – uncredited co-producer
"If I Should Die" features additional vocals by Wais and Half Dead.
"Nigga What, Nigga Who (Originator 99)" features additional vocals by Amil.
"It's Like That" features additional vocals by Liz.

Sample credits 
Intro (Hand It Down)
 "Are You Man Enough" by The Four Tops
 Contains lyrics from "Coming of Age" by Jay-Z feat. Memphis Bleek
Hard Knock Life (Ghetto Anthem)
 "It's The Hard Knock Life" from Annie
Money, Cash, Hoes 
 "Theme of Thief" from Tohru Nakabayashi & Y. "Dolphin" Takada (from the Golden Axe soundtrack)
A Week Ago
 "Ballad for the Fallen Soldier" by The Isley Brothers
Reservoir Dogs
 "Theme from Shaft" by Isaac Hayes
 "24- Carat Black (Theme)" by 24 Carat Black
 "Know How" by Young MC
It's Like That
 "Beggar's Song" by Wet Willie
It's Alright
 "The Hall of Mirrors" by Kraftwerk
 "Once In a Lifetime" by Talking Heads
Money Ain't a Thang
 "Weak at the Knees" by Steve Arrington

Charts

Weekly charts

Singles

Year-end charts

Decade-end charts

Certifications

See also
List of number-one albums of 1998 (U.S.)
List of number-one R&B albums of 1998 (U.S.)

References

External links 
 Samplin' Annie at Vibe
 Jay Z interview at Blues & Soul
 Cipha Sounds interview at Complex

Jay-Z albums
1998 albums
Albums produced by the 45 King
Albums produced by DJ Premier
Albums produced by Erick Sermon
Albums produced by Rockwilder
Albums produced by Swizz Beatz
Albums produced by Timbaland
Albums produced by Irv Gotti
Albums produced by Jermaine Dupri
Def Jam Recordings albums
Grammy Award for Best Rap Album
Roc-A-Fella Records albums
Sequel albums